Khodadad may refer to:
Khodadad, Hormozgan, a village in Iran
Khodadad, Kerman, a village in Iran
Khodadad, Zarand, a village in Kerman Province, Iran
Khodadad, Razavi Khorasan, a village in Iran
Khodadad, alternate name of Keryeh Sheykh Ali Khodadad, a village in Iran
Khodadad, alternate name of Kalateh-ye Khodadad, a village in Iran
Khodadad Azizi (born 1971), Iranian footballer
Behzad Khodadad (born 1981), Iranian Taekwondo athlete
Khodadad Mirza Farman Farmaian (1928–2015), Iranian nobleman

See also
Khodadadi (disambiguation)